Run Baby Run may refer to:

Music
"Run, Baby Run (Back Into My Arms)", 1965 by The Newbeats
Run Baby Run, a 1965 album by The Newbeats
"Run Baby Run" (Amanda Lear song), 1978
"Run Baby Run" (Sheryl Crow song), 1993
"Run Baby Run" (Garbage song), 2005
"Run Baby Run", a song by Bustafunk feat. Andrew Roachford
"Run Baby Run", a song by Deadstar

Other media
Run Baby Run, a 1968 autobiography by Nicky Cruz
Run Baby Run (video game), a 1983 ZX Spectrum game
Run Baby Run (2006 film), a Ghanaian action film directed by Emmanuel Apea
Run Baby Run (2012 film), a Malayalam-language comedy thriller directed by Joshiy
Run Baby Run (2023 film), a Tamil-language action thriller film directed by Jiyen Krishnakumar

Sports
Yanitelli Center, currently known as the Run Baby Run Arena